Road signs in Armenia are similar to the signs of other post-Soviet states and most European road sign systems. Armenia is a signatory of the Vienna Convention on Road Traffic and the Vienna Convention on Road Signs and Signals. The Ministry of Transport regulates these icons, while the police enforces them. Road signs ensure transport vehicles move safely and orderly, as well as, to inform both pedestrians and motorists of traffic rules.

Gallery

See also

 Comparison of European road signs
 Roads in Armenia
 Transport in Armenia

References
http://www.adcidl.com/pdf/Armenian-Road-Traffic-Signs.pdf

Armenia
Road transport in Armenia